Players and pairs who neither have high enough rankings nor receive wild cards may participate in a qualifying tournament held one week before the annual Wimbledon Tennis Championships.

Qualifiers

  Kate McDonald /  Kristine Radford
  Patricia Hy /  Meredith McGrath
  Maya Kidowaki /  Akemi Nishiya
  Rika Hiraki /  Amy van Buuren

Lucky losers

  Leigh-Anne Eldredge /  Lesley O'Halloran
  Anna-Maria Fernandez /  Themis Zambrzycki

Qualifying draw

First qualifier

Second qualifier

Third qualifier

Fourth qualifier

External links

1989 Wimbledon Championships – Women's draws and results at the International Tennis Federation

Women's Doubles Qualifying
Wimbledon Championship by year – Women's doubles qualifying
Wimbledon Championships